James Simpson (born 2 April 1873) was a Scottish footballer who played as a right half.

Career
Born in Ardrossan, Simpson played club football for Saltcoats Victoria and Third Lanark, and made three appearances for Scotland in 1895.

References

1873 births
Year of death missing
Scottish footballers
Scotland international footballers
Saltcoats Victoria F.C. players
Third Lanark A.C. players
Association football wing halves
Place of death missing
Scottish Junior Football Association players
Scottish Football League players
People from Ardrossan
Footballers from North Ayrshire